List of all the members of the Storting in the period 1821 to 1824. The list includes all those initially elected to the Storting as well as deputy representatives where available.

Members from rural constituencies

Members from urban constituencies

Notes

Citations

Sources 
 
Norwegian Social Science Data Service